There are two statues of Rev. Martin Luther King Jr. in Newark, New Jersey. Both are located on the Essex County Courthouse Complex at its newest addition, the Martin Luther King Justice Building.

2015 statue

The 2015 statue by Thomas Jay Warren was unveiled on the plaza near the Essex County Hall of Records, on October 14, 2015. The pedestal is engraved with "I Have a Dream", which references King's famous speech during the March on Washington for Jobs and Freedom. It notes his Nobel Peace Prize and is engraved with words ascribed to King: Hope, Equality, Peace, Courage, Love and Respect. An accompanying plaque reads:

"At a time in American history, when the need for change was evident, Martin Luther King, Jr., a young Georgia minister, rose to lead a nationwide civil rights movement. He guided a bus boycott that ended segregated seating, supported integrated groups of 'Freedom Riders' who shattered old, southern 'Jim Crow' laws, assisted young people conducting 'sit-ins' at segregated lunch counters, and led hundreds of peaceful protest marches. Brilliant, dignified, persuasive and eloquent, he always stressed non-violence, even in the face of adversity. He inspired thousands of people, of all colors, races and religions, to join hands, and more than 200,000 supporters gathered in Washington, DC, for his iconic 'I have a dream…' oration. As President of the Southern Christian Leadership Council, he brought attention to sources of national discrimination, helping to gain passage of the 1964 Civil Rights Act, forever changing the course of American history. Dr. King was awarded the Nobel Peace Prize for his work, on this very day, 50 years ago. Assassinated in 1968, he is one of the most respected and revered of all Human Rights activists."

"I show him at a younger age than you mostly see him," the sculptor said. "I tried to capture him at the time he visited Newark." Warren, based in Oregon, also created statues of Rosa Park, Justice William J. Brennan, Jr., Governor Brendan Byrne and Congressman Donald M. Payne at the Essex County Government Complex and the statue of Althea Gibson in Branch Brook Park.

The statue was relocated to the jurors entrance of the new courthouse building.

2021 statue

The 2021 statue in front of the new justice building was also created by Jay Warren. The  bronze scuplpture is placed on an  granite pedestal. It depicts King with his right arm gesturing, his hand is outstretched, and he is holding papers that signify victories in the Civil Rights movement – the Civil Rights Act of 1964 and the Voting Rights Act of 1965. The engraving quotes King: "We must learn to live together as brothers or perish together as fools. But I know somehow, that only when it is dark enough, can you see the stars. I have decided to stick with love, hate is too great a burden to bear. Life's most persistent and urgent question is, What are you doing for others?".

The interior lobby of the building serves is monument to the life and legacy of King. It includes a large mural with photographs of and quotes by King and a large-screen television which plays a video of him. Both works were created by Terri Haskins of Hackensack. Also in the lobby is a large bronze bust, also created by Warren, of Congressman and civil rights advocate John Lewis of Georgia, a close friend and associate of Dr. King.

Behold
A second casting was commissioned by the New Jersey Martin Luther King, Jr. Commemorative Commission, a government agency within the New Jersey Department of State. It was placed at  Essex County College in Newark and dedicated in a ceremony with Mayor Sharpe James in 1990.

See also
List of public art in Newark, New Jersey
Memorials to Martin Luther King Jr.
List of streets named after Martin Luther King Jr.
Martin Luther King, Jr. Memorial (Jersey City)
Civil rights movement in popular culture

References 

Memorials to Martin Luther King Jr.
Outdoor sculptures in New Jersey
2014 sculptures
2021 sculptures
Bronze sculptures in New Jersey
Statues in New Jersey
Sculptures of men in New Jersey
Public art in Newark, New Jersey